Monument Park may refer to:

Monument Park, Pretoria, South Africa
Monument Park (Yankee Stadium), New York
Monument Park, Lynn Haven, Florida, USA
Monument Park, Washington, USA; westernmost point of the US/Canada border on the 49th parallel

See also
Monument Park High School, Kraaifontein, Western Cape
Monument Park Historic District, Fitchburg, Massachusetts
Fallen Monument Park, Moscow